Carmen Eloisa Alguindigue Morles is a Venezuelan professor and activist. In 2019, she was appointed by the National Assembly as Venezuelan ambassador to Andorra. By 2022, she was one of four Venezuelan lawyers accredited to the International Criminal Court.

Career 
Carmen Alguindingue has served as prosecution director at the Public Ministry and as a professor, as well as a human rights defender at the Central University of Venezuela (UCV) and the Metropolitan University. In 2014, she actively participated in the defense of students detained during the nationwide protests that year.

During Venezuelan presidential crisis, in 2019, she was appointed by the National Assembly as Venezuela's ambassador to Andorra. That same year, officers of the Special Actions Forces (FAES) raided her home.

By 2022, she was one of four Venezuelan lawyers accredited to the International Criminal Court.

References 

Living people
Ambassadors of Venezuela
Ambassadors to Andorra
Women ambassadors
Year of birth missing (living people)